Surge (sometimes styled as SURGE) is a citrus-flavored soft drink first produced in the 1990s by The Coca-Cola Company to compete with Pepsi's Mountain Dew. Surge was advertised as having a more "hardcore" edge, much like Mountain Dew's advertising at the time, in an attempt to lure customers away from Pepsi. It was originally launched in Norway as Urge in 1996, and was so popular that it was released in the United States as Surge in 1997. Lagging sales caused production to be ended in 2003 for most markets.

However, popular fan bases such as Facebook's "SURGE Movement" led Coca-Cola to re-release the soft drink on September 15, 2014, for the US market via Amazon Prime in 12-packs of  cans. Following a test-market for the beverage in the Southeastern United States in early 2015, Surge was re-released primarily in convenience stores in the Eastern United States and some Mountain states in September 2015. Surge was re-released internationally in September 2018 in Burger King restaurants in the Coca-Cola Freestyle machines.

History

Early years

In 1997, Coca-Cola started production of Surge in the United States, with its original whitepaper name being "MDK," or "Mountain Dew Killer." It was developed to converge with Mello Yello as a means of slowing Mountain Dew growth. Coke's attempts to draw users away with divergent products like OK Soda or with similar ones like Mello Yello had not succeeded. Surge was intended to improve on Mountain Dew by using maltodextrin for a longer-lasting blast of energy and with bolder, brighter presentation. Its release was accompanied by a $50 million nationwide marketing campaign that led to high sales and popularity. A few years after the release, sales began to slip. Surge continued to be sold in vending machines, and  promotional surge coolers. The Surge coolers were placed in high traffic areas in gas stations as a key promotion to push sales away from competitors coolers in the back of stores all over the United States. Surge cans and fountain drinks until its eventual discontinuation in 2003.

While preparations for the US launch were underway, a cry for help came in from the Norwegian Division, who were battling a successful launch of Mountain Dew in their market. Because the Surge brand was already registered by another firm, the product was launched as "Urge". Local food regulation prevented the bright green color from being used, so it was launched with a pale, more natural juice drink look and given a slight orange taste to match the flavor with the color.
 
Until September 15, 2014, when Coca-Cola re-released Surge, Norway was the only country where one could still buy a similar soft drink in any form, as the original Surge recipe was still popular there.

Surge was widely associated with the extreme sports lifestyle, with television commercials similar to those used by Mountain Dew at the time. Coca-Cola also used provocative catchphrases to market Surge to extreme sports enthusiasts and teenagers alike. Some of these catchphrases included "Feed the Rush", "Life's a Scream" and the references to Surge as "A Fully Loaded Citrus Soda." Further touted was the fact that Surge had a considerable number of carbohydrates, hence the "with carbos" tagline that was occasionally used in the marketing campaigns to emphasize the fact that Surge was supposed to be more than a soda, but an energy drink as well.

After its inception, Surge's logo was updated and redesigned to a sharper and more modern look by a graphic designer/marketer named Colin Nekritz.

Trademark
In 1997 Coca-Cola settled a trademark dispute with Babson Bros., an industrial cleaning product company whose cow-milking machine has been known as Surge since 1925.

Revival
After the discontinuation of Surge in cans, a community was formed by web designer Eric "Karks" Karkovack entitled "Save Surge". The community initially mapped the locations at which Surge could be purchased in fountain form. Upon cancellation of the fountain syrup, the community continued, adopting an approach of activism that led to the creation of the citrus soda Vault in June 2005. After Vault's release, Karkovack announced the closure of SaveSurge.org. Vault was discontinued in 2011.

As a result of Vault's discontinuation, a group was started on Facebook by Evan Carr called the "Surge Movement". The group repeatedly posted requests on Coca-Cola's Facebook page, and encouraged its members to call Coca-Cola's consumer affairs hotline at 1-800-GET-COKE to voice their desires further, once every month. The movement gained around 200,000 Facebook "likes" in the months after it was started and continues to grow.

On September 15, 2014, Surge was re-released as an Amazon.com exclusive in packs of twelve  cans.

On February 10, 2015, Coca-Cola announced that it had begun test-marketing Surge with independent resellers and vending machines across the Southeast United States. The test run ended in late-May 2015. Two months later, Coca-Cola announced that it was preparing for a large-scale Surge retail release across the Eastern United States. Surge was re-released at convenience stores across the Eastern United States on September 7, 2015.

In August 2018, Surge became available in Coca-Cola Freestyle machines, exclusively at Burger King. It is available in several varieties, including Cherry, Grape, Vanilla, and Zero Sugar.

Slushy versions
On November 16, 2015, Burger King restaurants released a slushy version of the beverage called "Frozen Surge" as a limited edition slushy. Burger King reintroduced it in their restaurants as a fountain drink in August, 2018 

In late 2016, Valero Corner Stores partnered with Icee to release an Icee form of Surge at select locations.

On January 11, 2017, Cinemark theaters released a slushy version of the beverage called "Surge Frozen" for a limited time before being discontinued in Spring 2017.

Formulation
Comparisons of Surge have been made to a later Coca-Cola product, Vault, which was first released in 2005—around two years after the discontinuation of Surge. Vault has also been discontinued as of December 2011. The two drinks are noted to have had similar taste, although Vault contained higher levels of caffeine at 70.5 mg per 12 fl. oz serving (equivalent to ) and contained artificial flavors in its recipe. The caffeine content of Surge was comparable to that of other citrus soft drinks in the American market during its time at 51 mg per 12 fl. oz serving.

Below is a listing of the ingredients of Surge, per the label on the canned and bottled versions, as well as the ingredient listings from both a Surge fountain syrup box, and a Surge frozen carbonated beverage box. All four differ slightly; however, more information regarding the Surge formulation can be gleaned from both syrup variations, as they were to be mixed using a ratio of 4.4 parts cold, carbonated water to 1 part syrup.

See also
 Bawls
 Jolt Cola
 Josta

References

External links
Jay Moye (September 15, 2014). "SURGE Returns: Back by Popular Demand, Brand Now Available Exclusively on Amazon.com". Coca-Cola
 "Nutritional Facts"

Coca-Cola brands
Products introduced in 1997
Products introduced in 2014
Products and services discontinued in 2003
Citrus sodas
Caffeinated soft drinks